Geoffrey Davies (born 15 December 1942 in Leeds, West Riding of Yorkshire) is an English actor.

Biography
The son of an accountant, Davies was educated at grammar school and studied at art college to be a commercial artist before becoming an actor.

Career
He played at the Harrogate and Sheffield reps before doing a two-year course at the Royal Academy of Dramatic Art.

He is best known for his role as Dr. Dick Stuart-Clark in the hugely popular British television comedy series Doctor in the House (1969-70). He is the only member of the original cast to have performed in all the sequels, Doctor at Large, Doctor in Charge, Doctor at Sea, Doctor on the Go, Doctor Down Under - filmed in Australia - and Doctor at the Top. 

Back in the UK, he appeared in Bergerac and at Windsor and the Old Vic where he was in The Ghost Train. Davies also appeared in a Cinderella pantomime, where he played the role of Buttons, the servant of Cinderella's stepfather, and Cinderella's friend. He has done a number of tours of the Far East as well as Australia and New Zealand.

Davies' film roles include Oh! What a Lovely War (1969), Vault of Horror (1973) and Run for Your Wife (2012). His TV work includes Casual Affair, Kindly Leave the Raj and the Fossett Saga.

Family
Davies is married to Ann. Their daughter, Emma Davies, is also an actress having appeared in film and television roles since the mid-1980s.

External links

Geoffrey Davies - BBC Guide to Comedy
Geoffrey Davies biography

1942 births
Living people
English male film actors
English male stage actors
English male television actors
Male actors from Leeds
People educated at St. Clement Danes School